The Shaman is a bronze sculpture by James Lee Hansen, installed on the Washington State Capitol campus in Olympia, Washington, United States. The artwork was dedicated on October 8, 1971.

References

1971 establishments in Washington (state)
1971 sculptures
Bronze sculptures in Washington (state)
Outdoor sculptures in Olympia, Washington
Sculptures by James Lee Hansen
Washington State Capitol campus